Gunilla Victoria Andersson (born April 26, 1975) is an ice hockey player from Sweden. Andersson played Defense for the Sweden women's national ice hockey team, winning a silver medal at the 2006 Winter Olympics and a bronze medal at the 2002 Winter Olympics.

Also she played with the Segeltorps IF in the Riksserien (Sweden league elite).

Awards and honors
Best players of each team selection (as voted by coaches), 2011 IIHF Women's World Championship

References

1975 births
Living people
Ice hockey players at the 1998 Winter Olympics
Ice hockey players at the 2002 Winter Olympics
Ice hockey players at the 2006 Winter Olympics
Ice hockey players at the 2010 Winter Olympics
Medalists at the 2002 Winter Olympics
Medalists at the 2006 Winter Olympics
Olympic bronze medalists for Sweden
Olympic ice hockey players of Sweden
Olympic medalists in ice hockey
Olympic silver medalists for Sweden
People from Älvkarleby Municipality
Swedish women's ice hockey defencemen
Sportspeople from Uppsala County